Gigi Saul Guerrero (born February 27, 1990) is a Mexican filmmaker and actress. She gained recognition for creating and directing the 2017 horror web series, La Quinceañera. In 2019, she directed episodes of The Purge and the anthology horror series, Into the Dark.

Guerrero has been praised as one of the top emerging directors in the horror genre by Empire, Dread Central, Bloody Disgusting and Creators.co. Variety described her as part of the new wave of Latino talent.

Early life
Guerrero was born on February 27, 1990, in Mexico City, Mexico. She immigrated to Vancouver, British Columbia, Canada at the age of 13. She grew up in White Rock, British Columbia, and graduated with Honors with a B.A. in Motion Picture Production from Capilano University. As a child, she stole a VHS of Child's Play from Blockbuster, but was too scared to finish watching it.

Career

2011–2018: Career beginnings
Guerrero met two of her early collaborators, cinematographer Luke Bramley and producer Gordon Cheng, while studying film at Capilano University in 2009. Guerrero and Bramley were in the same class and bonded over a shared love of horror, while Cheng was in the year below them. In 2011, they collaborated on her directorial debut, the short film Dead Crossing, about zombie border guards eating Mexicans crossing into the United States. Guerrero stated she loved the overall experience of film school because it taught her how to be a professional. She co-founded the production company Luchagore Productions along with Bramley, Cheng, and producer Raynor Shima in 2013.

In 2014, she participated in the anthology series México Bárbaro. It was the first short production made under Luchagore Productions, and Guerrero's final film school project. Her segment Dia de los Muertos premiered at the 2014 Etheria Film Night. After viewing Dia de los Muertos, author Shane McKenzie approached Luchagore with adapting his novel, Muerte Con Carne. Later that year, Guerrero directed the adaptation of McKenzie's work, El Gigante, and distributed it in partnership with Raven Banner Entertainment. The success of El Gigante led to it being adapted into a graphic comic in English and Japanese.

A development executive at Warner Bros, contacted Guerrero upon viewing El Gigante, which led to Luchagore pitching several ideas, one of which became La Quinceañera. Two of her shorts, Slam and Testament, created as entries in film competitions Dead on Film and Phrike Film Fest respectively, picked up awards for Best Death (Testament) and Best Picture (Slam).

Her music video, Paloma, was the opening video for 2015 Morbido Fest. El Gigante featured at Melbourne's 2015 Monster Fest and Sydney's 2015 A Night of Horror International Film Festival, and won the Jury Award at the 2016 Macabre Faire Film Festival. Her next short, Madre de Dios, starring Tristan Risk, received praise for its design and screened at the 2015 Fantasia International Film Festival.

In 2016, she won the Artistic Innovation Award from Women in Film and Television Vancouver. Later that year, she directed a segment, M is for Matador, for the horror anthology film ABCs of Death 2.5. In 2017, her short film Bestia, was praised for its style and psychological horror. It won Best Short Film at the Blood in the Snow Canadian Film Festival.

Guerrero's next production was announced as "Project Lucha". The story emerged from talks between McKenzie and Guerrero, which centred around a girl becoming a strong woman. In October 2017, the project was revealed as La Quinceañera, a launch title for Stage 13, the digital content division for Warner Bros. Digital Networks. It features Mia Xitlali and Bertila Damas and held its world premiere at the Morbido Film Festival on October 28. It won the Golden Skull Award for Audience Favourite at the festival. In 2018, La Quinceañera debuted on the Studio+ app for Canal+ territories. In June 2018, it screened at Grauman's Chinese Theatre for the Los Angeles Latino International Film Festival. Dread Central praised La Quinceañera for its characters, noting its depiction of strong women as leaders.

Guerrero wrote a video game for Capcom, which was to be announced in 2018. In January 2018, she hosted the Vancouver Short Film Festival, which closed with a screening of Bestia. She teaches directing at Vancouver Film School.

2019–present: Breakthrough
In 2019, Variety selected her as one of the "10 Latinxs to Watch." She directed an episode of the horror anthology series Into the Dark for Blumhouse, and voiced Vida in Super Monsters. Guerrero received the job for the latter from Blumhouse after criticizing the original script for not being authentically Mexican. Guerrero insisted upon casting actors who were of Mexican descent and would switch between directing in English and Spanish while on set. To create a greater intensity for the finale, most of the episode was shot in chronological order. Guerrero's episode for Into the Dark, titled Culture Shock, premiered at the 2019 Etheria Film Night. In reflecting the current migrant situation in American, Guerrero stated it was "everybody’s horror story." Culture Shock was critically acclaimed, garnering 100% approval on Rotten Tomatoes and with some critics calling it the best in the series.

La Quinceañera screened as part of the 2019 Vancouver Women in Film Festival. In September 2019, she signed a first-look film and television deal with Blumhouse.

In October 2019, Screen Gems signed her to direct an untitled studio feature film based on the mythology of Santa Muerte, with a script by her frequent collaborator McKenzie. In January 2020, it was announced Guerrero was hired by Orion Pictures to direct the horror thriller 10-31, to be produced by Eli Roth, however Orion decided not to move forward shortly after. In March 2021, Guerrero was announced to direct Oscar-nominated actress Adriana Barraza in the film Bingo Hell for Amazon Studios.

Guerrero stars and voices Mischa Jackson/Lebron in the animated Peacock series, Supernatural Academy, based on the Young-Adult fantasy books by Jaymin Eve.

Personal life
Guerrero is inspired by horror that is new and unique, believing that story is the most important element to a movie. She uses humour to ease tension. Her self-described style is, "gritty, gory" with a "Tex-Mex" feel. She cites seeing a re-release of the director’s cut of The Exorcist in theatres when she was nine as having an influence on her. Guerrero counts among her inspirations "The Three Amigos of Cinema" (Guillermo del Toro, Alfonso Cuarón and Alejandro G. Iñárritu), in addition to Robert Rodriguez, Rob Zombie and Quentin Tarantino. Guerrero credits her Mexican heritage for influencing her filmmaking. The way that her Latin culture cherishes and celebrates death allows her to talk about it in her films.

Guerrero is known as "La Muñeca Del Terror" in Latin America, which translates to "The Doll of Terror".

Filmography

Film

Acting roles

Television

Acting roles

References

External links

1990 births
Living people
Capilano University alumni
Canadian women film directors
Film directors from Vancouver
Mexican emigrants to Canada
Mexican film actresses
Mexican film directors
Mexican television actresses
Mexican voice actresses
Mexican women film directors